The 2018 Sundance Film Festival took place from January 18 to January 28, 2018. The first lineup of competition films was announced on November 29, 2017.

Awards 
The following awards were presented:

 U.S. Dramatic Grand Jury Prize Award: The Miseducation of Cameron Post, directed by Desiree Akhavan
 U.S. Dramatic Audience Award: Burden, directed by Andrew Heckler
 U.S. Dramatic Directing Award: The Kindergarten Teacher, directed by Sara Colangelo
 U.S. Dramatic Waldo Salt Screenwriting Award: Nancy, written by Christina Choe
 U.S. Dramatic Special Jury Award for Outstanding First Feature: Monsters and Men, directed by Reinaldo Marcus Green
 U.S. Dramatic Special Jury Award for Excellence in Filmmaking: I Think We're Alone Now, directed by Reed Morano
 U.S. Dramatic Special Jury Award for Achievement in Acting: Benjamin Dickey, Blaze
 U.S. Documentary Grand Jury Prize Award: Kailash (later released as The Price of Free), directed by Derek Doneen
 U.S. Documentary Audience Award: The Sentence, directed by Rudy Valdez
 U.S. Documentary Directing Award, On Her Shoulders, directed by Alexandria Bombach
 U.S. Documentary Special Jury Award for Social Impact: Crime + Punishment, directed by Stephen Maing
 U.S. Documentary Special Jury Award for Creative Vision: Hale County This Morning, This Evening, directed by RaMell Ross
 U.S. Documentary Special Jury Award for Breakthrough Filmmaking: Minding the Gap, directed by Bing Liu
 U.S. Documentary Special Jury Award for Storytelling: Three Identical Strangers, directed by Tim Wardle
 World Cinema Dramatic Grand Jury Prize: Butterflies, directed by Tolga Karacelik
 World Cinema Dramatic Audience Award: The Guilty, directed by Gustav Möller
 World Cinema Dramatic Directing Award: And Breathe Normally, directed by Ísold Uggadóttir
 World Cinema Dramatic Special Jury Award for Acting: Valeria Bertuccelli, The Queen of Fear
 World Cinema Dramatic Special Jury Award for Screenwriting: Time Share (Tiempo Compartido), written by Julio Chavezmontes and Sebastián Hofmann
 World Cinema Dramatic Special Jury Award for Ensemble Acting: Dead Pigs, directed by Cathy Yan
 World Cinema Documentary Grand Jury Prize: Of Fathers and Sons, directed by Talal Derki
 World Cinema Documentary Audience Award: This is Home, directed by Alexandra Shiva
 World Cinema Documentary Directing Award: Shirkers, directed by Sandi Tan
 World Cinema Documentary Special Jury Award: Matangi/Maya/M.I.A., presented to director Stephen Loveridge and M.I.A.
 World Cinema Documentary Special Jury Award for Cinematography: Genesis 2.0, Peter Indergand and Maxim Arbugaev
 World Cinema Documentary Special Jury Award for Editing: Our New President, Maxim Pozdorovkin and Matvey Kulakov
 NEXT Audience Award: Searching, directed by Aneesh Chaganty
 NEXT Innovator Award: (tie) Night Comes On, directed by Jordana Spiro; We the Animals, directed by Jeremiah Zagar
 Short Film Grand Jury Prize: Matria, directed by Alvaro Gago
 Short Film Jury Award: U.S. Fiction: Hair Wolf, directed by Mariama Diallo
 Short Film Jury Award: International Fiction: Would You Look at Her, directed by Goran Stolevski
 Short Film Jury Award: Nonfiction: The Trader (Sovdagari), directed by Tamta Gabrichidze
 Short Film Jury Award: Animation: Glucose, directed by Jeron Braxton
 Special Jury Awards: Emergency, directed by Carey Williams; Fauve, directed by Jérémy Comte; and For Nonna Anna, directed by Luis De Filippis
 Sundance Institute Open Borders Fellowship Presented by Netflix: Of Fathers and Sons (Syria), directed by Talal Derki; Untitled film (India), directed by Chaitanya Tamhane; and Night on Fire, directed by Tatiana Huezo
 Sundance Institute / NHK Award: His House, directed by Remi Weekes
 Sundance Institute Alfred P. Sloan Feature Film Prize: Searching, Aneesh Chaganty and Sev Ohanian
 Sundance Institute / Amazon Studios Producers Award: Sev Ohanian

Films

U.S. Dramatic Competition

U.S. Documentary Competition

Premieres 
 Beirut by Brad Anderson
 The Catcher Was a Spy by Ben Lewin
 Colette by Wash Westmoreland
 Come Sunday by Joshua Marston
 Damsel by David Zellner
 Don't Worry, He Won't Get Far on Foot by Gus Van Sant
 A Futile and Stupid Gesture by David Wain
 The Happy Prince by Rupert Everett
 Hearts Beat Loud by Brett Haley
 Juliet, Naked by Jesse Peretz
 A Kid Like Jake by Silas Howard
 Leave No Trace by Debra Granik
 The Long Dumb Road by Hannah Fidell
 Ophelia by Claire McCarthy
 Private Life by Tamara Jenkins
 Puzzle by Marc Turtletaub
 Tully by Jason Reitman
 What They Had by Elizabeth Chomko

Documentary Premieres 
 Akicita: The Battle of Standing Rock by Cody Lucich
 Bad Reputation by Kevin Kerslake
 Believer by Don Argott
 Chef Flynn by Cameron Yates
 The Game Changers by Louie Psihoyos
 Generation Wealth by Lauren Greenfield
 Half the Picture by Amy Adrion
 Jane Fonda in Five Acts by Susan Lacy
 King in the Wilderness by Peter Kunhardt
 Quiet Heroes by Jenny Mackenzie
 RBG by Betsy West and Julie Cohen
 Robin Williams: Come Inside My Mind by Marina Zenovich
 Studio 54 by Matt Tyrnauer
 Won't You Be My Neighbor? by Morgan Neville

Midnight Premieres 
 Arizona by Jonathan Watson
 Assassination Nation by Sam Levinson
 Hereditary by Ari Aster
 Lords of Chaos by Jonas Åkerlund
 Mandy by Panos Cosmatos
 Never Goin' Back by Augustine Frizzell
 Piercing by Nicolas Pesce
 Revenge by Coralie Fargeat
 Summer of 84 by RKSS

World Cinema Dramatic Competition 
 And Breathe Normally by Ísold Uggadóttir (Iceland-Sweden-Belgium)
 Butterflies by Tolga Karaçelik (Turkey)
 Dead Pigs by Cathy Yan (China)
 The Guilty by Gustav Möller (Denmark)
 Holiday by Isabella Eklöf (Denmark-Netherlands-Sweden)
 Loveling by Gustavo Pizzi (Brazil-Uruguay)
 Pity by Babis Makridis (Greece-Poland)
 The Queen of Fear by Valeria Bertuccelli and Fabiana Tiscornia (Argentina-Denmark)
 Rust by Aly Muritiba (Brazil)
 Time Share (Tiempo Compartido) by Sebastián Hofmann (Mexico-Netherlands)
 Un Traductor by Rodrigo Barriuso and Sebastián Barriuso (Canada-Cuba)
 Yardie by Idris Elba (U.K.)

World Cinema Documentary Competition 
 Anote's Ark by Matthieu Rytz (Canada)
 The Cleaners by Moritz Riesewieck and Hans Block (Germany/Brazil)
 Genesis 2.0 by Christian Frei and Maxim Arbugaev (Switzerland)
 Matangi/Maya/M.I.A. by Stephen Loveridge (Sri Lanka/United Kingdom/United States)
 Of Fathers and Sons by Talal Derki (Germany/Syria/Lebanon/Qatar)
 The Oslo Diaries by Mor Loushy and Daniel Sivan (Israel/Canada)
 Our New President by Maxim Pozdorovkin (Russia/United States)
 A Polar Year by Samuel Collardey (France)
 Shirkers by Sandi Tan (United States)
 This Is Home by Alexandra Shiva (Jordan/United States)
 Westwood: Punk, Icon, Activist by Lorna Tucker (United Kingdom)
 A Woman Captured by Bernadett Tuza-Ritter (Hungary)

Juries
Jury members, for each program of the festival, including the Alfred P. Sloan Jury were announced on January 16, 2018.

U.S. Documentary Jury
 Barbara Chai
 Simon Chinn
 Chaz Ebert
 Ezra Edelman
 Matt Holzman

U.S. Dramatic Jury
 Rachel Morrison
 Jada Pinkett Smith
 Octavia Spencer
 Michael Stuhlbarg
 Joe Swanberg

World Documentary Jury
 Hanaa Issa
 Ruben Östlund
 Michael J. Werner

World Dramatic Jury
 Joslyn Barnes
 Billy Luther
 Paulina Suárez

Alfred P. Sloan Jury
 Robert Benezra
 Heather Berlin
 Kerry Bishé
 Nancy Buirski

NEXT Jury
 RuPaul Charles

Short Film Jury
 Cherien Dabis
 Shirley Manson
 Chris Ware

References

External links
 

2018 film festivals
2018 in Utah
2018
2018 in American cinema
January 2018 events in the United States
2018 festivals in the United States